Rhododendron is an unincorporated community in Clackamas County, Oregon, United States. It is located within the Mount Hood Corridor, between Government Camp and Zigzag on U.S. Route 26 (a.k.a. the Mount Hood Scenic Byway). It is one of the communities that make up the Villages at Mount Hood.

A post office was established in the area in 1909 and named "Rowe" after Henry S. Rowe, a mayor of Portland, Oregon who was interested in developing the state's scenic attractions. In 1917 the office was renamed "Zig Zag" and shortly thereafter "Zigzag". (The name was later reused for the post office in the current community of Zigzag.) In 1920 the office was renamed "Rhododendron" because of the large number of rhododendrons growing near there. The community started out as a summer resort colony, but with the increased popularity of skiing, it became a year-round settlement.

References

See also
 Mount Hood Village CDP
 Village (Oregon)

Portland metropolitan area
Unincorporated communities in Clackamas County, Oregon
1909 establishments in Oregon
Populated places established in 1909
Unincorporated communities in Oregon